The 1935 Florida Gators football team represented the University of Florida during the 1935 college football season. The season marked Dennis K. Stanley's third and final year as the head coach of the Florida Gators football team. The highlights of the season included the Gators' victories over Sewanee (20–0) and South Carolina (22–0). Stanley's 1935 Florida Gators finished with an overall record of 3–7 and a Southeastern Conference (SEC) tally of 1–6, placing twelfth of thirteen SEC members.

Before the season
The team's captain was Billy Chase.

Schedule

Postseason
Stanley submitted his resignation at the end of the season in the face of alumni discontent, but, in an unusual move, remained a member of the coaching staff when the new head coach, Josh Cody, took over in 1936. Stanley, who was also an education professor, later became the first dean of the university's new College of Health and Human Performance in 1946.

References

Florida
Florida Gators football seasons
Florida Gators football